Big Brother 2005 was the fifth season of the Dutch version of Big Brother. Three years after its initial cancellation, Big Brother was brought back. John de Mol decided to air it on his own TV station Talpa. Although he did not own the rights anymore after he left Endemol. It lasted from 24 August to 22 December 2005 for a total of 121 days.

The season was shown with moderate success in the early evening. The house had moved from Almere to Aalsmeer, and the presenters were Bridget Maasland and Ruud de Wild.

The theme for this season was Secrecy. Housemates entered with a secret that they weren't allowed to reveal to other housemates. Aside from usual weekly tasks, the housemates received secret missions to spark distrust and conflicts. Some gained cash which they had to hide from the other housemates.

Housemates

Summary
The season was dominated by the relationship between Dido and Roel, who shared his bed with Lieske and Linda as well. The season borrowed elements from foreign series, like the introduction of Nathalie s ex-boyfriend. However, most attention was directed at Tanja, who was seven months pregnant. Tanja could be evicted before the baby would be born. Tanja s smoking during pregnancy was debated in the media, as well as the role of the father who didn't want any responsibility but enjoyed his fame.

On 18 October 2005, Tanja gave birth to her daughter Joscelyn Savanna in front of the cameras, it's a Big Brother first. Because of limitations by the Dutch Labour Inspectorate, the baby wasn't allowed to be shown for extended periods. Tanja voluntary left with her daughter on Day 65 as she felt she was being poorly treated by her fellow housemates.

Towards the end of the season, producers were accused of tampering with the results of the SMS-and telephone votes during eviction rounds. A campaign by third season housemate Gert-Jan de Boer called for the attendance of a Notary at least during the finals, and Endemol gave in. In the end, the winner of the season was Joost.

Nominations Table

Notes

External links
 World of Big Brother

2005 Dutch television seasons
05